Samuel Aaron Moyn (born 1972) is the Henry R. Luce Professor of Jurisprudence at Yale Law School and Professor of History at Yale University, which he joined in July 2017. Previously, he was a professor of history at Columbia University for thirteen years and a professor of history and of law at Harvard University for three years. His research interests are in modern European intellectual history, with special interests in France and Germany, political and legal thought, historical and critical theory, and Jewish studies.

He has been co-director of the New York-area Consortium for Intellectual and Cultural History, is editor of the journal Humanity, and has editorial positions at several other publications.

Academic career 
After attending University City High School in St. Louis, Missouri, Moyn earned his A.B. degree from Washington University in St. Louis in history and French literature (1994). He continued his education, earning a Ph.D. from the University of California at Berkeley (2000) and his J.D. from Harvard Law School (2001). 

In 2007, Moyn received Columbia University's annual Mark Van Doren Award for outstanding undergraduate teaching, determined by undergraduates, and its Distinguished Columbia Faculty Award for "unusual merit across a range of professorial activities". In 2008, he won a Guggenheim Fellowship, and is currently a Berggruen Fellow at the Edmond J. Safra Center for Ethics at Harvard.

He is also a fellow at the Quincy Institute for Responsible Statecraft.

Personal life 
Samuel Moyn is Jewish. He is also married.

Publications

Books 
Origins of the Other: Emmanuel Levinas between Revelation and Ethics (2005, Cornell University Press)
A Holocaust Controversy: The Treblinka Affair in Postwar France (2005, Brandeis University Press)
Pierre Rosanvallon, Democracy Past and Future (2006, editor Samuel Moyn, Columbia University Press) 
 The Last Utopia: Human Rights in History (2010, Harvard University Press)
 Human Rights and the Uses of History (2014, Verso)
 Christian Human Rights (2015, University of Pennsylvania Press)
 Not Enough: Human Rights in an Unequal World (2018, Harvard University Press)
 Humane: How the United States Abandoned Peace and Reinvented War (2021, Macmillan)

Selected articles 
 "Imperial Graveyard" (review of George Packer, Our Man:  Richard Holbrooke and the End of the American Century, Cape, 2019, 592 pp.), London Review of Books, vol. 42, no. 3 (6 February 2020), pp. 23–25.  Moyn concludes his review, on p. 25: "[Packer's book] Our Man may be the most vivid tour of America's foreign delusions that has been offered since the Vietnam War."
 "The Road to Hell" (review of Samantha Power's The Education of an Idealist: A Memoir), American Affairs Journal Vol. IV, Spring 2020 pp. 149–160.
 "Michael Ratner's Tragedy, and Ours" (essay adapted by the author from his 2021 book Humane: How the United States Abandoned Peace and Reinvented War), The New York Review of Books, September 1, 2021.

References

External links

Top Young Historians: Samuel Moyn on History News Network
New York-area Consortium for Intellectual and Cultural History
  The Court is not Your Friend,Samuel Moyn,Dissent Magazine, Winter 2020

1972 births
Living people
21st-century American historians
21st-century American male writers
Columbia University faculty
University of California, Berkeley alumni
Harvard Law School alumni
Washington University in St. Louis alumni
Intellectual historians
20th-century American Jews
American male non-fiction writers
21st-century American Jews